William Hadden may refer to:
 William J. Hadden (1921–1995), Protestant minister  and chaplain
 William L. Hadden (1896–1983), American politician, lieutenant governor of Connecticut